Killanne (or Killann, Killane) is a rural village roughly  west of Enniscorthy, County Wexford, Ireland.

Kate Webster, who was hanged for the murder of Julia Martha Thomas, was born around 1849 in Killanne as Kate Lawler at her family's home.

United Irish leader John Kelly, who died in 1798, was from Killanne. The song "Kelly the Boy From Killane", about John Kelly and the 1798 rebellion, references Killanne.

See also
 List of populated places in the Republic of Ireland

Towns and villages in County Wexford